Marianne Nøhr Larsen (born 1963) is a Danish anthropologist and writer who since 2002 has run the networking facility "Center for Interkulturel dialog" (Centre for Intercultural Dialogue) in Copenhagen.

Biography
Born on 26 March 1963, after matriculating from Helsingør Gymnasium, Nøhr Larsen studied anthropology at the University of Copenhagen graduating in 1995. Since 2002, she has headed the Copenhagen networking consultancy "Center for Interkulturel Dialog" where she has arranged courses and workshops on intercultural dialogue. In particular, she has helped Greenlanders and Muslims adapt to life in Denmark. In regard to Muslim women, she has worked on problems associated with arranged marriages and wearing headscarves. She has spoken out against the efforts of the Danish authorities to force the Danish way of life on ethnic minorities: "The more you force them to act in a given way, the more they'll fight against it." Nøhr Larsen has also written about the difficulty experienced by homosexuals belonging to ethnic minorities.

Selected publications
Nøhr Larsen has published a considerable number of books and papers including:

References

1963 births
Living people
Danish anthropologists
Danish women anthropologists
20th-century Danish non-fiction writers
21st-century Danish non-fiction writers
21st-century Danish women writers